The Erie to Pittsburgh Trail is a  rail trail being developed between Erie and Pittsburgh in Western Pennsylvania and Western New York. It will also connect to the Erie Canal trail via New York Bike Route 517 along Lake Erie.

There are two tunnels on the trail's route: Rockland Tunnel and Kennerdell Tunnel. The Kennerdell Tunnel is one of the longest rail trail tunnels in the United States and among the longest bicycle/pedestrian tunnels in the world.

References

External links
 Official site

Rail trails in Pennsylvania
Rail trails in New York (state)